Kamil Kosiba (born 22 February 1999) is a Polish volleyball player, a member of the club Exact Systems Norwid Częstochowa.

References

External links
 SMSSpala profile
 Krispol1Liga profile
 SportProAgency profile
 Volleybox profile
 U21.Men.2019.Volleyball.FIVB profile

1999 births
People from Gorlice County
Living people
Polish men's volleyball players